West Cornwall may refer to:

United States
 West Cornwall, Connecticut
 West Cornwall Township, Pennsylvania, in Lebanon County
 West Cornwall district, Cornwall, Vermont

United Kingdom
 West Cornwall (UK region)
 West Cornwall (UK Parliament constituency), created in 1832 and abolished in 1885

See also
 Cornwall (disambiguation)
 West (disambiguation)